William Lipscomb was a Nobel Prize-winning American chemist.

William Lipscomb may also refer to:
William Lipscomb (clergyman) (1829–1908), preacher of the Restoration Movement and associate of Tolbert Fanning
William Lipscomb (writer), English clergyman, translator and poet
William Lipscomb (cricketer), English barrister and cricketer
W. P. Lipscomb (William Percy Lipscomb), British-born Hollywood playwright, screenwriter, producer and director